Thatcher Magoun (June 17, 1775 – April 16, 1856) was a shipbuilder who specialized in large ships and brigs, 250-tons and larger, built for the China trade. His reputation, according to the maritime historian Admiral Samuel Eliot Morison, was "second to none among American shipbuilders." He was also called the "Father of Shipbuilding on the Mystic River."

Career
In 1803, Magoun established the first shipyard in Medford, Massachusetts on what is known today as Riverside Avenue, opposite the end of Park Street. The shipyard was called T. Magoun & Son. That same year, he laid the keel of his first vessel, the 188-ton Mt. Aetna, the model of which he had made a few years before. He continued building ships at this location until 1836; eventually his yard was to be the only one in Medford with a Shophouse. The clipper ship Thatcher Magoun was launched in 1855. She was named in his honor.

In 1851, B. F. Delano buit two ships at the Magoun shipyard for  W. W. Goddard, of Boston. Delano built the pilot boat William Starkey, a Boston schooner-rigged pilot boat built in 1854. The biggest ships built at the Thatcher Magoun shipyard at Medford were the 1,294-ton clipper ship Herald of the Morning and the 1,286-ton Kingfisher.

Magoun amassed significant wealth by building 84 vessels over the course of his career. He specialized in big ships and brigs, which were 250-tons and larger in size, built for Old China Trade. According to the maritime historian Admiral Samuel Eliot Morison, Magoun's reputation was "second to none among American shipbuilders." He was also called "the Father of Shipbuilding on the Mystic River", and is buried in Mount Auburn Cemetery.

Thatcher Magoun House
Magoun built a mansion on High Street, Medford, Massachusetts which eventually became the town library.

Delano family
His daughter, Susan Bradshaw Magoun (1812-1885), married William Adams (1807-1880). They had a daughter, Susan Magoun Adams (1848-1904) who married Eugene Delano (1844-1920). They had a son William Adams Delano (1874-1960), who was a member of the prominent Delano family of Massachusetts.

See also
60 State Street
William Adams Delano

References

 WorldCat entry
 Find-a-Grave entry

1775 births
1856 deaths